News media in India is owned by business families and individuals along with numerous investors, in the form of joint stock companies, societies, trusts and firms. The Government of India owns news media such as DD News and All India Radio. While the news media market (readership and viewership) in India is highly concentrated, the total number of owners includes over 25,000 individuals, 2000 joint stock companies and 1200 societies.

Private ownership 

Majority stake or ownership for news companies have changed over time such as is the case of TV9; Srini Raju let go of his nearly 80% share in 2018.

Government ownership

References

Further reading 

 
 —

Lists of mass media in India
Mass media by owner
News media in India